Quino (1932–2020) was an Argentine cartoonist.

Quino may also refer to:
 Quinó River, a river in Roraima, Brazil
 Quino River, a river in Chile
 27178 Quino, an inner main-belt asteroid named after the Argentine cartoonist

People with the given name
 Quino Cabrera (born 1971), Spanish footballer
 Quino Colom (born 1988), Spanish-Andorran basketball player
 Quino Sierra (born 1945), Spanish footballer